Darapsa choerilus, the azalea sphinx, is a moth of the family Sphingidae first described by Pieter Cramer in 1779. It is found in the United States and southern Canada east of the Rocky Mountains.

The wingspan is 57–75 mm.

The larvae feed on azalea and Viburnum species.

References

External links

Macroglossini
Moths described in 1779
Moths of North America